Erukattur (எருக்காட்டூர்)  is a village in the Koothanallur taluk of Tiruvarur district in Tamil Nadu, India. The village is located 10.2 km southwest of Thiruvarur and 10.5 km southeast of Koradacheri. Very recently the taluk was changed from Kudavasal to Koothanallur.

Demographics 

As per the 2001 census, Erukattur had a population of 1,059 with 525 males and 534 females. The sex ratio was 1017. The literacy rate was 72.9.

References 

 

Villages in Tiruvarur district